James Watson Webb III (known as J. Watson Jr.) (January 9, 1916 – June 10, 2000) was an American film editor and heir to both the Havemeyer and Vanderbilt families.

Early life
He was born in Syosset, New York, to James Watson Webb II of the Vanderbilt family and Electra Havemeyer. His siblings were Electra (1910–1982), Samuel (1912–1988), Lila (1913–1961) and Harry (1922–1975).
 
He attended Groton School and Yale University from which he graduated in 1938.

Career
He began work in California as an apprentice film editor at 20th-Century Fox, and eventually head of the editing department. He eventually became Zanuck's head film cutter and was involved in the founding of the American Cinema Editors.

Webb was the credited editor—as "J. Watson Webb" or "J. Watson Webb Jr."—on 30 films from 1941–52 including A Letter to Three Wives, The Razor's Edge with Tyrone Power, Wing and a Prayer, State Fair, With a Song in My Heart, Call Northside 777, Broken Arrow with James Stewart and Cheaper by the Dozen.

Also among his credits, along with Three Wives (1949) starring Jeanne Crain, Linda Darnell, Ann Sothern and Kirk Douglas were The Jackpot (1950) also with Stewart and Don't Bother to Knock (1952) starring Marilyn Monroe, Richard Widmark and Anne Bancroft. Webb retired from film editing in 1952. Barbara McLean, his boss, promoted Hugh S. Fowler to replace Webb.

Shelburne Museum
Webb succeeded his mother and served as the president of the Shelburne Museum from 1960 until 1977 and then as chairman of the board of directors until 1996. Watson resigned from the board in a dispute over deaccessioning of an estimated $25-million worth of the museum's Impressionist collection which his mother had donated to the museum.

Webb gave his mother's folk art first purchase, made at the age of 18 in Stamford, Connecticut, prominent display in his California home for decades.

Personal life
He died in Los Angeles, California, on June 10, 2000. Webb never married and was survived by three nephews and six nieces.

References

Further reading
 Weitzenhoffer, Frances. The Havemeyers: Impressionism Comes to America. New York: H.N. Abrams, 1986.

External links

1916 births
2000 deaths
American film editors
Groton School alumni
James Watson III
People from Syosset, New York
James Watson III
Yale University alumni